Agrupación Virgen de Fátima–San Juan Biker Motos is an Argentinian cycling team founded in 2015.

Team roster

Major results
2019
Stage 1 Vuelta del Uruguay, Nicolás Naranjo
Stages 2 & 9 Vuelta del Uruguay, Nicolás Tivani
2022
 Overall Vuelta del Porvenir San Luis, Nicolás Tivani
Stages 2 & 4, Nicolás Tivani
 Overall Vuelta a Formosa Internacional, Nicolás Tivani
Stages 2b & 4, Nicolás Tivani

References

External links

UCI Continental Teams (America)
Cycling teams established in 2015
Cycling teams based in Argentina